The 2001 Northwestern Wildcats football team represented Northwestern University during the 2001 NCAA Division I-A football season. They played their home games at Ryan Field and participated as members of the Big Ten Conference. They were coached by Randy Walker.

Schedule

Roster

Team players in the NFL

References

Northwestern
Northwestern Wildcats football seasons
Northwestern Wildcats football